Stewart M. Renfrew was a Scottish football centre forward who played in the Scottish League for Cowdenbeath and Queen of the South. He was capped by Scotland at junior level.

Career statistics

Honours 

Cowdenbeath Hall of Fame

References

Scottish footballers
Cowdenbeath F.C. players
Scottish Football League players
Year of birth missing
Year of death missing
Place of birth missing
Association football forwards
Sheffield Wednesday F.C. players
Queen of the South F.C. players
Derry City F.C. players
NIFL Premiership players
Scotland junior international footballers